Anthony Reid  (born 19 June 1939) is a New Zealand-born historian of Southeast Asia. His doctoral work at Cambridge University examined the contest for power in northern Sumatra, Indonesia in the late 19th century, and he extended this study into a book The Blood of the People on the national and social revolutions in that region 1945–49.  He is most well known for his two volume book "Southeast Asia in the Age of Commerce", developed during his time at the Australian National University in Canberra. His later work includes a return to Sumatra where he explored the historical basis for the separate identity of Aceh; interests in nationalism, Chinese diaspora and economic history, and latterly the relation between geology and deep history.

Professor Reid taught Southeast Asian history at University of Malaya (1965–1970) and Australian National University (1970–1999). He became the founding director of the Southeast Asia Center, University of California, Los Angeles, 1999–2002, and then the founding director of Asia Research Institute (ARI) at the National University of Singapore (NUS), 2002–2007. He retired from NUS in 2009. Since then he has been based in Canberra as Professor (Emeritus) at the Australian National University.

As a writer of fiction he styles himself Tony Reid. He is the son of John S. Reid, a New Zealand diplomat who held postings in Indonesia, Japan and Canada in the 1950s and 1960s.

Awards 
In 2002 Professor Reid won the Fukuoka Asian Culture Prize in the category of academics. He was elected as a Corresponding Fellow at the prestigious British Academy on 17 July 2008.

List of major publications 
The Contest for North Sumatra: Atjeh, the Netherlands and Britain, 1858–1898.  Kuala Lumpur, OUP/UMP, 1969.  Reissued by University of Malaya Press, 1974; New edition University of Malaya Press, 2017. Indonesian translation as Asal Mula Konflik Aceh, Jakarta, Yayasan Obor, 2004
The Indonesian National Revolution, 1945–1950.  Hawthorn, Vic.  Longmans Australia, 1974.   Reprinted by Greenwood Press, Westport, Conn., 1986. Indonesian translation as Revolusi Nasional Indonesia. Jakarta, Sinar Harapan, 1996.
The Blood of the People: Revolution and the End of Traditional Rule in Northern Sumatra.  Kuala Lumpur, OUP, 1979. Indonesian translation as Perjuangan Rakyat: Revolusi dan Hancurnya Kerajaan di Sumatra.  Jakarta, Sinar Harapan, 1986. 
Southeast Asia in the Age of Commerce, 1450–1680.  Vol.I: The Lands below the Winds.  New Haven, Yale University Press, 1988. 
- Indonesian translation as Asia Tenggara dalam Kurun Niaga (Jakarta, Yayasan Obor, 1992).
- Southeast Asia edition Trasvin Publications [Silkworm Books], Chiang Mai, 1995, reprinted 1999.
- Japanese translation Hosei University Press, 1997.
- Thai translation Silkworm Books, Chiang Mai, 2004
- Chinese translation by The Commercial Press, 2010.
Southeast Asia in the Age of Commerce, 1450–1680.  Vol.II: Expansion and Crisis.  New Haven, Yale University Press (1993).
- Indonesian translation as Dari Ekspansi hingga Krisis: Jaringan Perdagangan Global Asia Tenggara, 1450–1680, (1999).
- Japanese translation as Daikokai Jidai no Tonan Ajia II (Tokyo, Hosei University Press,, 2001).
- Thai translation 2004; Chinese translation 2010
Charting the Shape of Early Modern Southeast Asia. Chiang Mai: Silkworm Books, 1999, 298pp.  Indonesian translation (2004).
An Indonesian Frontier: Acehnese and other histories of Sumatra. Singapore: Singapore University Press, 2004; 439pp.- reprinted 2005. Indonesian translation 2011.

Imperial Alchemy: Nationalism and Political Identity in Southeast Asia. Cambridge: Cambridge University Press, 2009. 
To Nation by Revolution: Indonesia in the Twentieth Century. Singapore: NUS Press, 2011.  Indonesian translation, 2018.
A History of Southeast Asia: Critical Crossroads. Chichester, UK: Wiley/Blackwell, 2015. Chinese and Japanese translations, 2021

Reid has also written a novel about 17th century Java depicting the experiences of Tom Hodges, an Englishman, who arrives in Java in 1608 and aims to make his fortune in the pepper trade:

 Mataram: A Novel of Love, Faith and Power in Early Java. 2018. Leicestershire, UK: Monsoon Books.   (paperback)   (ebook)

References 

 Anthony Reid and the Study of the Southeast Asian Past, ed. Geoff Wade and Li Tana (Singapore: ISEAS, 2012).
 New Zealand’s Early Steps in Asia: A Biography of John S. Reid and Family, by Anthony Reid (Canberra: 2020) 
 Helen Margaret Reid (née Gray): Negotiating Language and Culture, by Anthony Reid and Helen Reid (Canberra 2021)

External links 

Australian National University: Profile – Anthony Reid

Historians of Southeast Asia
Academic staff of the Australian National University
Academic staff of the National University of Singapore
Living people
1939 births
Corresponding Fellows of the British Academy
Fellows of the Royal Historical Society
University of Malaya
University of California, Los Angeles faculty